The 2003 Lagos State gubernatorial election occurred on 19 April 2003. Incumbent Governor AD's Bola Tinubu won election for a second term, defeating PDP's Funsho Williams and four other candidates.

Bola Tinubu emerged unopposed in the AD gubernatorial primary after all the aspirants stepped down. He had Femi Pedro as his running mate.

Funsho Williams was the PDP candidate.

Electoral system
The Governor of Lagos State is elected using the plurality voting system.

Results
A total of six candidates registered with the Independent National Electoral Commission to contest in the election. AD Governor Bola Tinubu won re-election for a second term, defeating PDP's Funsho Williams and four minor party candidates.

The total number of registered voters in the state was 4,558,216.

References 

Lagos State gubernatorial elections
Gubernatorial election 2003
Lagos State gubernatorial election